Michele Rigione (born 7 March 1991) is an Italian footballer who plays for Serie B side Cosenza as a centre back.

Club career

Chievo and Inter
Born in Naples, Campania, Rigione had played for Veneto club Chievo since 2001. In August 2007 he joined Inter's under-17 team on loan for €205,000 with an option to co-own the player, and made his debut for Inter's reserves – Primavera in February 2008. He also played 4 times for the first team in club friendlies in 2008–09 and 2009–10 season. In June 2008 he was signed in a co-ownership deal for €350,000.

On 21 July 2010, he was loaned to Lega Pro Prima Divisione club Foggia, as a replacement of departed defenders likes Lorenzo Burzigotti. He became a starting centre-back since round 5 (except round 6), partnering with Simone Romagnoli, Andrea Iozzia or Andrea Torta. He also played 5 matches at 2010–11 Coppa Italia Lega Pro, except the first match as unused bench.

On 22 June 2011 Inter bought the remain rights of Rigione for €500,000 (made Inter registered an additional €150,000 financial cost) and on the same day Chievo also acquired Rincón and youth player Davide Tonani for a nominal fee. Additionally Marco Andreolli returned to Chievo also for €500,000, making the deals were pure player swap.

Rigione went on loan to two more clubs (Cremonese in Lega Pro 1st Division along with Bocalon and Grosseto in Serie B along with Donati) until he was released by Inter on 30 June 2013 as a free agent.

Catanzaro
In July 2013 he was signed by Catanzaro on a 3-year contract.

On 23 April 2015, Rigione terminated his contract at Catanzaro by a mutual consent, leaving him as a free agent.

Teramo & Lanciano
In July 2015 he joined Teramo. However, the club was expelled from 2015–16 Serie B due to a match fixing scandal. On 31 August he joined another Serie B club Lanciano.

Cesena
On 21 July 2016 Rigione was signed by Cesena on a free transfer, signing a 2-year deal.

Chievo
On 29 June 2017, 1 day before the end of Cesena and Chievo's financial year, Rigione, Garritano, Rodríguez and Daniele Grieco of Cesnea was sold to Chievo for Kupisz, Filippo Zambelli, Pietro Borgogna, Lorenzo Placidi and Carloalberto Tosi. Additionally, Lamin Jallow moved to Cesena on a temporary deal, with an option to purchase at the end of 2017–18 season.

However, on 30 August 2017 Rigione returned to Cesena on loan. On 10 January 2018 he was signed by fellow Serie B club Ternana on another loan.

At the end of 2017–18 season, Cesena was bankrupted, while Rigione failed to find a team for 2018–19 season. He was registered as a youth product of Chievo for the Homegrown Player Rule.

Novara (loan)
On 30 January 2019, Rigione joined to Novara on loan until 30 June 2019.

Cosenza
On 13 August 2021, he signed a two-year contract with Cosenza.

International career
Rigione played twice for Italy U19 team, both were friendlies. He also capped twice at 2008 UEFA European Under-17 Football Championship qualification. He received his first call-up from Italy U20, a feeder team of U21, for 2010–11 Four Nations Tournament in November.

According to Internazionale, Rigione was the captain of Italy national under-17 football team.

References

External links
 
 Football.it Profile 
 

Italian footballers
A.C. ChievoVerona players
Inter Milan players
Calcio Foggia 1920 players
U.S. Cremonese players
F.C. Grosseto S.S.D. players
S.S. Virtus Lanciano 1924 players
A.C. Cesena players
Novara F.C. players
Cosenza Calcio players
Serie B players
Serie C players
Association football central defenders
Italy youth international footballers
Footballers from Naples
1991 births
Living people